Josef Ettlinger (1869–1912) was a German literary historian, critic, journalist and translator.

Life and work
Ettlinger came from a Jewish mercantile family.   Initially he studied Music, but he found that he suffered from deafness and therefore switched to Philology.   He received his doctorate in 1891 for a dissertation on the seventeenth century Silesian poet Christian Hoffmann von Hoffmannswaldau and then embarked on a successful career in publishing.   Ettlinger was the founder, publisher and till his death managing editor of Das literarische Echo, a prominent bi-monthly literary magazine.

Published output (selection)

Biographical and fictional 
 Christian Hofman von Hofmanswaldau. Ein Beitrag zur Literaturgeschichte des siebzehnten Jahrhunderts (1891)
 Benjamin Constant. Der Roman eines Lebens.

Translation 
 Gustave Flaubert: Madame Bovary (first German-language edition, 1892)

External links

Notes and sources

1869 births
1912 deaths
Writers from Karlsruhe
German male journalists
German literary critics
19th-century German male writers
20th-century German male writers